The Council of Egypt is a 2002 Italian drama film directed by Emidio Greco. It is based on the novel with the same name written by Leonardo Sciascia. It premiered at the 2002 Montreal World Film Festival, in which it entered the main competition.  The film was awarded with a Nastro d'Argento for best scenography.

Cast 
 Silvio Orlando: Don Giuseppe Vella
 Tommaso Ragno: Layer Francesco Paolo Di Blasi
 Renato Carpentieri: Monsignor Ayroldi
 Antonio Catania: Don Saverio Zarbo
 Marine Delterme: Countess Regalpetra
 Leopoldo Trieste: Father Salvatore
 Giancarlo Giannini: Narrator (voice)

References

External links

2002 films
Italian drama films
Films based on Italian novels
Films directed by Emidio Greco
Films based on works by Leonardo Sciascia
Films scored by Luis Bacalov
2002 drama films
2000s Italian films